Tilla or Tella (dTil-la or gudTi-el-la)  was a Hurrian god.

Worship of Tilla is best attested in documents from Nuzi, where he was the most common deity in Hurrian theophoric names next to the weather god Teshub. He also had a temple in this area and an entu priestess who resided in Kuruḫanni (modern Tell al-Fakhar). His cult city was Ulamme, also located in the kingdom of Arrapha. While he is commonly identified as a "bull god," there is no indication that he was imagined in such a form from any sources other than Song of Ullikummi.

In the Song of Ullikummi, part of the cycle of myths about Kumarbi, Tilla is one of the two bulls who pull Teshub's chariot, the other one being Šerišu. During preparations for battle with the eponymous giant, Teshub says Tilla's tail needs to be covered with gold. In other sources, such as offering lists, Šerišu is paired with Hurriš, not Tilla. Piotr Taracha considers the pair Tilla and Šerišu to belong to eastern Hurrian tradition, and Šerišu and Hurriš to western. Sources from Nuzi appear to consider Tilla an independent deity, rather than a divine draft animal of the weather god. 

The theophoric name Ur-Tilla known from Puzrish-Dagan and Nippur refers to another deity, seemingly worshiped in Umma, whose name is derived from the Sumerian word tillá (written AN.AŠ.AN or AN.DIŠ.AN), "street."

References

Bibliography

Hurrian deities
Hurrian legendary creatures
Cattle deities